KFBR (91.5 FM) is a radio station licensed to serve the community of Gerlach, Nevada. The station is owned by Friends of Black Rock High Rock, Inc.

The station was assigned the KFBR call letters by the Federal Communications Commission on December 15, 2010.

References

External links
 

FBR
Radio stations established in 2011
2011 establishments in Nevada
Washoe County, Nevada